Southport Warriors Soccer Club is a semi-professional soccer club based in Southport, Queensland, Australia. The club play in the Football Queensland Premier League 3 − South Coast, the top flight of the Football Queensland South Coast administrative division. The club has won 5 premierships, 7 championships and 6 President's Cups (top flight cups), with a variety of second division honours.  

Founded in 1976, the Southport Warriors have been a regular contender within senior competitions and they were a founding member of both the Gold Coast Premier League in 1991, and the reformed streamline Football Queensland pyramid in 2022. The club's home ground is the Ashmore Village Park, perpendicular with Ashmore State School. 

The vision of the club is "to be a club that our members and community are proud of and want to be a part of".

Honours

Football South Coast 

 FQPL 3 − South Coast / Gold Coast Premier League (first tier)
 Premiership
 Winners (5): 1987, 1989, 1990, 1996, 1998
 Championship
 Winners (7): 1987, 1988, 1989, 1990, 1996, 2011, 2021
 President's Cup
 Winners (6): 1987, 1989, 1993, 1994, 1996, 2004

 FQPL 4 − South Coast / Men's Coast League 1 / First Division (second tier)
 Premiership
 Winners (1): 1992
 Championship
 Winners (1): 1992
 President's Cup
 Winners (1): 1992

References

External links
 

Association football clubs established in 1976
1976 establishments in Australia
Southport, Queensland
Soccer teams on the Gold Coast, Queensland